The following is a list of the 30 municipalities (comuni) of the Province of Forlì-Cesena, Emilia-Romagna, Italy.

List

See also
List of municipalities of Italy

References

Forli-Cesena